Tuntutuliak is a census-designated place (CDP) in Bethel Census Area, Alaska, United States. At the 2010 census the population was 408, up from 370 in 2000.

Geography
Tuntutuliak is located at  (60.342643, -162.672666).

Demographics

Tuntutuliak first appeared on the 1950 U.S. Census as the unincorporated village of "Tuntatuliag." The spelling was changed to the present Tuntutuliak effective with the 1970 census. It was made a census-designated place (CDP) in 1980.

As of the census of 2000, there were 370 people, 84 households, and 74 families residing in the CDP.  The population density was 3.1 people per square mile (1.2/km2).  There were 97 housing units at an average density of 0.8 per square mile (0.3/km2).  The racial makeup of the CDP was 0.81% White, 98.92% Native American, and 0.27% from two or more races.  0.81% of the population were Hispanic or Latino of any race.

There were 84 households, out of which 54.8% had children under the age of 18 living with them, 57.1% were married couples living together, 16.7% had a female householder with no husband present, and 11.9% were non-families. 10.7% of all households were made up of individuals, and 1.2% had someone living alone who was 65 years of age or older.  The average household size was 4.40 and the average family size was 4.74.

In the CDP, the population was spread out, with 42.7% under the age of 18, 11.1% from 18 to 24, 25.4% from 25 to 44, 15.4% from 45 to 64, and 5.4% who were 65 years of age or older.  The median age was 23 years. For every 100 females, there were 110.2 males.  For every 100 females age 18 and over, there were 109.9 males.

The median income for a household in the CDP was $25,500, and the median income for a family was $26,000. Males had a median income of $38,750 versus $18,750 for females. The per capita income for the CDP was $7,918.  About 27.3% of families and 23.0% of the population were below the poverty line, including 29.1% of those under age 18 and none of those age 65 or over.

The main language spoken in the village is Yup'ik (translated to Yupiaq which means "genuine" or "real" people). This is the first language which the children are exposed to. That would make English their second language which is learned in the local school (Lewis Angapak Memorial School).

The name Tuntutuliak in the Yup'ik language means "the land of many caribou." The first settlers of the village moved to Tuntutuliak from an old village site called Qinaq. What is left of the old village is nothing but graves, and maybe a bear home at the end of the river called "Avcuamciq" which divided Qinaq in half.

The governing body of the village is called the Tuntutuliak Tribal Council. The Council is also divided into several other smaller companies. Those companies are the Environmental  Protection Agency, the local police department(VPOs-Village Police Officers, VPSOs-Village Public Safety Officers), and the health clinic.

Education
Lower Kuskokwim School District operates Lewis Angapak Memorial School, K-12.  the students are Yupik people.

References

Census-designated places in Alaska
Census-designated places in Bethel Census Area, Alaska
Census-designated places in Unorganized Borough, Alaska